Qobuqıraq (also, Qobuqqıraq, Kobukyrakh, and Kubakyrakh) is a village and municipality in the Khachmaz Rayon of Azerbaijan.  It has a population of 1,214.  The municipality consists of the villages of Qobuqıraq and Mürsəlliqışlaq.

References 

Populated places in Khachmaz District